Dowles Brook flows through the heart of the Wyre Forest, into the former civil parish of Dowles and into the River Severn.

History 

In 1902, ornithologist and naturalist Jannion Steele Elliott purchased the Elizabethan era building Dowles Manor, near the confluence of Dowles Brook into the Severn. By the time of his death, in 1942, he had bought up the surrounding land, piecemeal, until he owned the portion of the valley, formed by the Dowles Brook, surrounding Dowles Manor; he maintained this land as a nature reserve.

Conservation 

During the summer of 2012, with funding from the Environment Agency, the Worcestershire Wildlife Trust attempted an ambitious project to eradicate the invasive Himalayan Balsam from a 3 km watercourse, hoping to improve biodiversity and reduce soil erosion. A pilot project was carried out on the Lem Brook, a tributary of the Dowles Brook.This was a success but as the seeds persist in the soil for up to two years repeat eradication was planned for 2014 followed by close monitoring.

References

Dowles Brook
1Dowles
Rivers of Worcestershire